Geyeria decussata is a moth in the Castniidae family.

Description
The forewings are dark brown with green iridescent scales and a disruptive pattern of white bands. In details, there are a small sinuous band near the apex and an Y marking in the middle. Also the hindwings are brown with five white spots in the border. The head, antenna and thorax are brown. Caterpillars of these moths feed on the leaf bases of bromeliads (Wittrockia superba, Vriesea philippo-coburgii  and Aechmea nudicaulis).

Distribution
This species can be found in Brazil.

References

Moths described in 1824
Castniidae
Castniidae of South America
Moths of South America